Sun Qiaolu (12 June 1995 – 1 January 2021) was a Chinese actress.

Biography 
Sun Qiaolu appeared in the Chinese children's television series, Ba La La Little Demon Fairy, as the fairy Ling Meiqi. After the show ended, she started a fashion business and became a social media influencer. She studied Acting at New York Film Academy.

Death
She died of a heart attack on 1 January 2021, aged 25.

References

1995 births
2021 deaths
Chinese television actresses